Nikolaj Lie Kaas (born 22 May 1973) is a Danish actor whose career rose in the 1990s. Kaas graduated from the National Theater School in Denmark in 1998. He first appeared on screen in Søren Kragh-Jacobsen's film The Boys from St. Petri in 1991 as Otto, the rebel son of a traitor.

The son of actor Preben Kaas and actress/writer Anne Mari Lie, Kaas and his wife have two daughters. Their daughter Gerda Lie Kaas starred in the lead role of Clara for the Danish juvenile fantasy film, Wild Witch (2018).

In 2002 and 2012, Kaas won the Robert Award for Best Actor in a Leading Role.

In 2012, Kaas received the Lauritzen Award.

In 2003, Kaas was named as one of European film's "Shooting Stars" by European Film Promotion.

Filmography

References

External links 
 

1973 births
Living people
20th-century Danish male actors
21st-century Danish male actors
Best Actor Bodil Award winners
Best Actor Robert Award winners
Best Supporting Actor Bodil Award winners
Danish male film actors
Danish male television actors
Danish male screenwriters
Danish television directors
People from Rødovre